Zagornye Kletya is a rural locality (a village) in Dmitriyevo-Polyansky Selsoviet, Sharansky District, Bashkortostan, Russia. The population was 94 as of 2010. There are 3 streets.

Geography 
Zagornye Kletya is located 19 km northwest of Sharan (the district's administrative centre) by road. Istochnik is the nearest rural locality.

References 

Rural localities in Sharansky District